Ferdinand Faczinek (31 December 1911 – 1991) was a footballer from Slovakia, who played internationally for Czechoslovakia (8 caps).

External links

 Profile
 Profile

1911 births
1991 deaths
Slovak footballers
Czechoslovak footballers
Czechoslovakia international footballers
AC Sparta Prague players
Ligue 1 players
FC Sochaux-Montbéliard players
Chamois Niortais F.C. players
FC Sète 34 players
Czechoslovak football managers
Slovak football managers
Chamois Niortais F.C. managers
RC Strasbourg Alsace managers
Czechoslovak expatriate sportspeople in France
Czechoslovak expatriate footballers
Expatriate footballers in France
Expatriate football managers in France
Association football forwards
Footballers from Bratislava